The Lairet River is a tributary of the Saint-Charles River, crossing Quebec City, Quebec, Canada. Over two kilometers long, it took its source in the vicinity of Charlesbourg and flowed in meanders in Limoilou. It has been completely channeled since the 1960s, except for a segment refitted in 2008.

Geography 
Last tributary of the North shore of Saint-Charles river before it flows into the Saint-Laurent river, the Lairet river was once several tens of kilometers long. It originally took its source north of seigniory Saint-Ignace, west of trait-carré de Charlesbourg. It then headed southeast towards Limoilou where it widened and consisted of small meanders.

History 

On September 14, 1535, the river was seen for the first time by French explorer Jacques Cartier. Cartier and his crew overwinter at the confluence of the Lairet River and the Saint-Charles River, near the village St. Lawrence Iroquoians of Stadaconé. In New France, the name of the river appeared for the first time on a document in 1626 (designated "Rivière de Lairet" in 1637 and "Rivière de Larray" in 1685). The Jesuits also used the name "Jacques-Cartier river" in 1651, probably in connection with the Jacques-Cartier fort, a Jesuit residence built at the mouth of the river from 1625. Jean-Baptiste Larue used the toponym “Rivière à la Rez” in 1821. Until XXth, the course of the river retains its natural state and crosses agricultural land.

The industrialization of Limoilou reveals several industries and institutions near the Lairet river in the first half of XXth Century. In this urbanized segment, the river gradually becomes an open sewer. In addition, the winding course is an obstacle in the construction of grid lines streets. The pipeline is requested by different owners. On March 15, 1960, the member for Québec-Est, Armand Maltais, announced the start of work on pipeline from the river. This work will take place in three phases (1960, 1965 and 1967). Finally, the river is channeled to its mouth with the Saint-Charles River passing under the Cartier-Brébeuf National Historic Site. This work then became part of the concreting of the banks of the Saint-Charles river, which was completed in the 1970s.

Parts of the pipeline collapsed in the 2000s in Cartier-Brébeuf Park. However, the majority of the course of the river is still underground. The Saint-François d'Assise hospital, originally built on the banks of the river, is nowadays struggling with water infiltration.

Gallery

References 

Rivers of Capitale-Nationale
Landforms of Quebec City